Nylon Pool is an in-sea shallow white ground coral pool that is located off Pigeon Point, Tobago, and is accessible by boat. Its name is derived from its resemblance to a swimming pool. It is close to the Buccoo Reef, a protected area full of coral reefs. It was named by Princess Margaret in 1962. It is also one of Trinidad and Tobago's most visited attractions.

References

 http://www.tobagowi.com/sites/buccooreef.htm
 http://www.amazing-trinidad-vacations.com/buccoo-reef.html
 http://wikimapia.org/2783088/Buccoo-Reef-Nylon-Pool
 Nylon Pool

Geography of Tobago
Bodies of water of Trinidad and Tobago
Tourist attractions in Trinidad and Tobago